The 1980–81 Ranji Trophy was the 47th season of the Ranji Trophy. Bombay won the title defeating Delhi in the final.

Highlights
In the quarterfinal against Railways, Madan Lal of Delhi scored 140 and 100 and took 3/87 and 5/56

Group stage

North Zone

Central Zone

South Zone

West Zone

East Zone

Knockout stage

Final

Scorecards and averages
Cricketarchive

References

External links

1981 in Indian cricket
Domestic cricket competitions in 1980–81
Ranji Trophy seasons